DD2 could refer to:
 Destruction Derby 2, a 1996 video game
 Double Dragon II: The Revenge, a 1988 arcade game
 DD2 Electronics, an electronic store in Honduras
 DD2, a postcode district in the DD postcode area (Dundee postcode area), part of a group of eleven postcode districts in eastern Scotland
 PRR DD2 (Pennsylvania Railroad class DD2), a single prototype electric locomotive built in 1938
 Rotax Max DD2, an engine configuration designed by Rotax and used in kart racing